Sayed Anwar Azad is an ethnic Hazara folkloric singer from Afghanistan. He plays folkloric and regional traditional Hazara music on the dambura.

Early life
Seyed Anwar Azad was born in 1969, in Yakawlang, Bamyan, Afghanistan. In 1989, when he was about 20 years old, he turned to the Hazara folkloric and regional traditional music of dambura based on his artistic motives.

References 

1969 births
Living people
Hazara singers
Dombra players
21st-century Afghan male singers
People from Bamyan Province
20th-century Afghan male singers